Time Benders is the fourteenth novel in World of Adventure series by Gary Paulsen. The novel was published on August 11, 1997 by Random House.

Plot
The story is about Zack Griffin and Jeff Brown who both win trips to a famous science laboratory. There they discover that one of the machines in the lab can "bend" time, and they end up in ancient Egypt.

Novels by Gary Paulsen
1997 American novels
American young adult novels
Children's science fiction novels
Novels about time travel
Random House books
1997 children's books